Drama is a British free-to-air television channel broadcasting drama (and, to a lesser extent, comedy, sci-fi) programming in the United Kingdom and Ireland as part of the UKTV network of channels.

History
The channel launched on 8 July 2013, replacing Blighty. On Freeview, the channel was placed on channel 20, previously occupied by Gold. On Sky, the channel initially launched on channel 291, in the overspill area of the Entertainment section and moved to channel 166 on 24 July after purchasing the slot used by PBS America (formely named PBS UK in 2011). The channel launched on Virgin Media on 14 August on channel 190. In September 2014, UKTV blamed the channel for their 7% profits fall. In September 2018, Drama and Really were added to Virgin Media Ireland.

A timeshift channel, Drama +1 was launched on Sky and Virgin Media on 16 September 2019 replacing Travel Channel +1. On 25 January 2021, it was announced that the timeshift channel would be taking over CCXTV's Freeview slot (channel 73) on 1 February 2021, with CCXTV ending transmission. On 1 February 2022, BBC Three relaunched on Freeview channel 23 which shifted all the channels from that slot until Freeview 82 down a place, meaning that Drama +1 was now on channel 74.

On 28 March 2022, Drama +1 moved to Freeview 60 as a limited reach channel, as channel 25 was used by UKTV for their female skewing W channel, which means that Dave ja vu took the COM4 slot from Drama +1 on Freeview channel 74.

Programming
The channel is positioned as a home for British dramas from the last 40 years. The channel has featured classic drama series such as Auf Wiedersehen, Pet; The Cinder Path; Cranford; Lark Rise to Candleford; Pride & Prejudice; Sharpe; and Tipping the Velvet. As well as all these classic drama titles, a number of more recently produced BBC One daytime drama series have acquired a primetime slot on Drama. These series include Father Brown, which has been showing in an 8pm slot on Friday nights and which has a spin-off series, called Sister Boniface Mysteries. This period detective television series about a Catholic Nun is a co-production between BBC Studios and Britbox in North America, and has debuted as a free-to-air series directly on Drama, without getting an airing first on BBC One. In addition to drama programmes, the channel shows a number of classic BBC sitcoms in a teatime slot (usually between 5.25pm and 8pm) with Last of the Summer Wine, Keeping Up Appearances,  The Brittas Empire and Birds of a Feather currently being repeated in March 2023.

Current

2point4 Children
A Place to Call Home
All Creatures Great and Small
'Allo 'Allo!
As Time Goes By
Are You Being Served?
Ashes to Ashes
Auf Wiedersehen, Pet
Bad Girls
Bergerac
The Bill
Birds of a Feather (the BBC series)
Boon
Bramwell
The Brittas Empire
Brush Strokes
The Brokenwood Mysteries
Butterfiles
Call the Midwife
Catherine Cookson: The Cinder Path
Catherine Cookson: Colour Blind
Catherine Cookson: The Dwelling Place
Catherine Cookson: The Fifteen Streets
Catherine Cookson: The Gambling Man
Catherine Cookson: The Girl
Catherine Cookson: The Glass Virgin
Catherine Cookson: The Man Who Cried
Catherine Cookson: The Rag Nymph
Catherine Cookson: The Round Tower
Catherine Cookson: The Secret
Catherine Cookson: The Tide of Life
Catherine Cookson’s Tilly Trotter
Catherine Cookson: The Wingless Bird
Classic Casualty
Clocking Off
Classic EastEnders 
Dalziel and Pascoe
Dangerfield
Death in Paradise
The Doctor Blake Mysteries
Doctor Finlay
Down to Earth
Ever Decreasing Circles
Father Brown
A Fine Romance
Fresh Fields
French Fields
The Green Green Grass
Hetty Wainthropp Investigates
Hi-de-Hi!
Holby City
The House of Eliott
Howards' Way
Hustle
The Inspector Alleyn Mysteries
Inspector George Gently
The Inspector Lynley Mysteries
Judge John Deed
Just Good Friends
Kavanagh QC
Keeping Up Appearances
The Last Detective
Last of the Summer Wine
Life on Mars
London's Burning
Lovejoy
Miss Marple
Monarch of the Glen
The Mrs Bradley Mysteries
Murdoch Mysteries
New Tricks
One Foot In The Grave
The Paradise 
PD James: The Murder Room
Peak Practice
Pie in the Sky
The Prisoner
Rebus
Return of the Saint 
Sharpe
Sherlock
Shetland
Silent Witness
Sliders
Some Mothers Do 'Ave 'Em
Space: 1999
Spooks
Taggart 
Tenko
To The Manor Born
Touching Evil
Trial & Retribution
The Two Ronnies
UFO
Waiting for God
Waking the Dead

Previous

The 39 Steps
The 60's: The Beatles Decade
Above and Beyond
Act of Will
Ahead of the Class 
Ain't Misbehavin'
Archangel
Ballykissangel
Bert and Dickie
The Best of Men 
Between the Lines
A Bit of a Do
A Bit of Fry and Laurie 
Birdsong
Born and Bred
Bring Me Morecambe & Wise
Britains Best - Scotland
Burton & Taylor
Cadfael
Casanova
Catherine Cookson: The Black Candle
Catherine Cookson's Colour Blind
Catherine Cookson: A Dinner of Herbs
Catherine Cookson: The Moth
The Cazalets
Cider with Rosie
Citizen Smith 
Cold Comfort Farm
The Courageous Heart of Irena Sendler
Cranford
The Crimson Petal and the White
Daniel Deronda
David Copperfield
dinnerladies
Deadline Gallipoli
Death Comes to Pemberley
Doctor Doctor
Doctor Who
EastEnders' Christmas Fallouts
EastEnders: Unveiled - A Wedding Special
Emma
Empire
Eric and Ernie
Escape from Sobibor
The Fall and Rise of Reginald Perrin
Family Tree
Fanny Hill
Find My Past
A Fine Romance
The Forsyte Saga
A Garden for All Seasons
The Good Life
Goodnight Sweetheart
Gracie!
Great British Ghosts
Great Expectations
The Great Train Robbery
Hard Times
Hattie
Hitlers Bodyguards 
Hold the Dream
House of Cards
Jam & Jerusalem
Jane Eyre
Jonathan Creek
King Solomon's Mines
Land Girls
Lark Rise to Candleford
Last Tango in Halifax
Learners
The Life and Adventures of Nicholas Nickleby
The Liver Birds
The Long Firm
Mansfield Park
The Mayor of Casteridge
Men Behaving Badly
The Most Wonderful Time of the Year
Monarch of the Glen
Murder in Mind
Murphy's Law
The Mystery of a Hansom Cab
The Mystery of Edwin Drood
My Family
My Hero
No Place Like Home
North & South
Northanger Abbey
Oliver Twist
Outnumbered 
Our Mutual Friend
Parade's End
PD James: Death in Holy Orders
Persuasion
Porridge
Pride and Prejudice
Ration Book Britain
The Road to Coronation Street
Rosemary & Thyme
The Ruby in the Smoke
Rumpole of the Bailey
The Scarlet Pimpernel
The Scold's Bridle
The Sculptress
The Secret of Crickley Hall
Sense and Sensibility
The Shadow in the North
Sherlock Holmes and the Secret Weapon 
Sherlock Holmes: Terror By Night
Sherlock Holmes - The Case of the Silk Stocking
Silk
Shirley
The Sinking of the Laconia
Sisters of War
Soldier Soldier
South Riding
State of Play
Steptoe and Son (only series 1-6)
The Tenant of Wildfell Hall
Terry and June
Tess of the D'Urbervilles
Three Up, Two Down
Tipping the Velvet
To Be the Best
The Turn of the Screw
United
Upstairs, Downstairs
Vanity Fair
The Vicar of Dibley
The Whale
What Remains
Whatever Happened to the Likely Lads
Where the Heart Is
Whitechapel
Wish Me Luck
A Woman of Substance
A Year to Remember
The Young Ones
Young James Herriot
Young Catherine
You Rang M'Lord?

References

External links

Television channels in the United Kingdom
Television channels and stations established in 2013
UKTV
UKTV channels
2013 establishments in the United Kingdom